Draposa is a genus of wolf spiders in the family Lycosidae, containing ten species. The species were formerly included in genus Pardosa, but later included in the new genus Draposa.

Species
 Draposa amkhasensis (Tikader & Malhotra, 1976) — India
 Draposa atropalpis (Gravely, 1924) — India, Sri Lanka
 Draposa burasantiensis (Tikader & Malhotra, 1976) — India, China
 Draposa lyrivulva (Bösenberg & Strand, 1906) — Pakistan, India, Sri Lanka
 Draposa nicobarica (Thorell, 1891) — Nicobar Islands
 Draposa oakleyi Gravely, 1924 — Pakistan, India, Bangladesh
 Draposa porpaensis (Gajbe, 2004) — India
 Draposa subhadrae (Patel & Reddy, 1993) — India, Sri Lanka
 Draposa tenasserimensis (Thorell, 1895) — Myanmar, possibly Sumatra, Java
 Draposa zhanjiangensis (Yin et al., 1995) — China, possibly Malaysia, Sumatra, Borneo

References

Lycosidae
Spiders of Asia
Araneomorphae genera